Shopping TVA is a Canadian French language television shopping program that was broadcast on the Canadian television networks Télé Achats and TVA, from 1996 to August 30, 2013.

Shopping TVA consisted of hosts along with product representatives demonstrating and selling products to television viewers. The program feature the sale of a variety of products including beauty and personal care, entertainment, health and fitness, and home improvement items.

Shopping TVA was hosted by Louise-Josée Mondoux and his team with Julie Nault (host), Mario Beaurivage (physical fitness expert), Mélanie Marchand (kitchen expert) and Marie-Johanne Martineau (beauty care expert).

Viewers could purchase items either by telephone or internet.

History

In 1996 and 1997, TVA debuted a home shopping television program known as Télé-Achats, hosted by Louise-Josée Mondoux and Serge Laprade.

In 1997, TVAchats Inc. was founded in partnership with the French company .

From 1997, the TV program was known as Boutique TVA, hosted only by Louise-Josée Mondoux until 2003.

On March 18, 2003, TVAchats Inc. became a wholly owned subsidiary of Groupe TVA.

In 2003, the TV program was renamed STV Shopping TV, hosted by Louise-Josée Mondoux and several alternating animators until 2013.

In 2005, the TV program was renamed Shopping TVA. Shopping TVA was also known as TVA Boutiques in 2012 and 2013.

On June 13, 2013, Groupe TVA announced the closure of TVA Boutiques for the August 30, 2013. At the same time, TVA had confirmed that Shopping TVA TV program would not return the following fall at its programming.

References

External links
STV Shopping TV Official website  (from the Internet Archive Wayback Machine)
Shopping TVA Official website  (from the Internet Archive Wayback Machine)
Boutique TVA Official website  (from the Internet Archive Wayback Machine)
Shopping TVA on TVA  (from the Internet Archive Wayback Machine)

TVA (Canadian TV network) original programming
Television shows filmed in Montreal
Infomercials